Weston Williamson is a British architectural firm formed in 1985 and based  in London, Melbourne, Sydney and Toronto.

History
Weston Williamson was established in 1985 by Andrew Weston and Chris Williamson, who met whilst studying architecture.  Weston and  Williamson had also both studied with Steve Humphreys at Leicester Polytechnic School of Architecture, who joined the practice in 1991. In 2008 Rob Naybour became a fourth director.

In 2013 Weston Williamson became an LLP forming WestonWilliamson+Partners with the introduction of 9 new partners.

Weston Williamson + Partners has worked on a number of projects internationally including  schemes for Transport for London, Crossrail, HS2, the Docklands Light Railway, the Melbourne Metro Rail Authority,  the Dubai Transport Authority and the Malaysian Transport Authority. Other projects include the Oliver Morris House in Brixton, New England Bio laboratories in Boston and the Jubilee line extension at London Bridge.

Projects
 Metro Tunnel
 Paddington and Woolwich Elizabeth line stations 
 Paddington Integrated Project
 Docklands Light Railway Extension to London City Airport 
Docklands Light Railway Extension to Woolwich
East London Line Stations at Hoxton and Dalston Junction railway Jubilee line station at London Bridge
 Paddington Crossrail 
Miami Metromover 
HS2 Old Oak Common 
Barking Riverside Station

References

External links 
 

Architecture firms based in London
Companies based in the London Borough of Redbridge
British companies established in 1985